The Edward Beale House is a historic home located at Potomac, Montgomery County, Maryland.  It is a Colonial Revival residence built in 1938, and designed to look like a Pennsylvania farmhouse that has evolved over centuries. The -story house has a modified telescope form composed of stone and frame sections covered with side-gable slate shingle roofs.  It was designed and built by Delaware architects Pope and Kruse.

It was listed on the National Register of Historic Places in 1996.

References

External links
, including photo in 1988, at Maryland Historical Trust website

Colonial Revival architecture in Maryland
Houses completed in 1938
Houses in Montgomery County, Maryland
Houses on the National Register of Historic Places in Maryland
National Register of Historic Places in Montgomery County, Maryland